The World Database on Protected Areas (WDPA) is compiled and managed by the World Conservation Monitoring Centre, an executive agency of the United Nations Environment Programme. It uses the IUCN and CBD definitions of protected areas to determine whether a site should be included in the WDPA. The extend to which each area and the resources within are protected can vary significantly.

The largest protected areas – those exceeding an area of 250,000 square kilometres – are listed below in order of total area protected. All are marine protected areas except for Northeast Greenland National Park – which is mostly terrestrial but also has a marine component – and three entirely terrestrial biosphere reserves in Brazil. Protected areas with multiple coterminous or overlapping designations (e.g. Northeast Greenland National Park and the corresponding Biosphere Reserve) are listed only once.

Currently, Marae Moana is the largest protected area in the world with a total area larger than Mexico (1,964,375 km2).

Largest protected areas of the world

References

Largest
Protected areas
Protected areas